The following tables list the largest mergers and acquisitions by decade of transaction. Transaction values are given in the US dollar value for the year of the merger, adjusted for inflation. , the largest ever acquisition was the 1999 takeover of Mannesmann by Vodafone Airtouch plc at $183 billion ($ billion adjusted for inflation). AT&T appears in these lists the most times with five entries, for a combined transaction value of $311.4 billion. Mergers and acquisitions are notated with the year the transaction was initiated, not necessarily completed. Mergers are shown as the market value of the combined entities.

Free market enterprises

1870s
Top M&A deal worldwide by value from 1870 to 1879:

1900s
Top 3 M&A deals worldwide by value from 1900 to 1909:

1910s
Top 3 M&A deals worldwide by value from 1910 to 1919:

1920s
Top 5 M&A deals worldwide by value from 1920 to 1929:

1930s
Top 5 M&A deals worldwide by value from 1930 to 1939:

1940s
Top 5 M&A deals worldwide by value from 1940 to 1949:

1950s
Top 10 M&A deals worldwide by value from 1950 to 1959:

1960s
Top 10 M&A deals worldwide by value from 1960 to 1969:

1970s
Top 15 M&A deals worldwide by value from 1970 to 1979:

1980s
Top 30 M&A deals worldwide by value from 1980 to 1989:

1990s
Top M&A deals worldwide by value ($20 billion or larger) from 1990 to 1999:

2000s
Top M&A deals worldwide by value ($20 billion or larger) from 2000 to 2009:

2010s
Top M&A deals worldwide by value ($20 billion or larger) from 2010 to 2019:

2020s 
Top M&A deals worldwide by value ($20 billion or larger) from 2020 to 2029:

State-owned enterprises
Top M&A deals worldwide by value ($20 billion or larger) between state-owned enterprises:

Largest ever deals which have failed to complete
This lists catalogues M&A deals ($20 billion or larger in transaction value) which were confirmed, but for a number of reasons, failed to complete.

See also
 List of largest companies by revenue
 List of largest employers
 List of largest corporate profits and losses
 List of public corporations by market capitalization
 List of largest pharmaceutical mergers and acquisitions
 List of largest corporate spin-offs

Notes

References

Largest mergers and acquisitions
Largest mergers and acquisitions
Mergers and acquisitions